Paolo Angelo Ballerini (14 September 1814 – 27 March 1897) was an Italian prelate who was named by Pope Pius IX as the Archbishop of Milan. He also served as the Latin Patriarch of Alexandria. His cause of canonization has begun and he is now a Servant of God.

Life 
Ballerini was born in Milan in 1814, at the time, part of the Kingdom of Italy. In 1837 he was ordained  as a priest for his native archdiocese and then in December 1857 he was named vicar general of the archdiocese. In the early days of 1858, Archbishop Romilli suffered a stroke so Ballerini's duties in the management of the archdiocese were increased due to the critical condition of archbishop Romilli.

Archbishop of Milan 
In May 1859 Romilli died so following the Concordat of 1855 the Austrian emperor suggested Ballerini, a staunch conservative, as Archbishop of Milan and Pope Pius IX accepted soon. The Italian government, that had taken possession of Milan and Lombardy after the Second Italian War of Independence, refused to recognize Ballerini as archbishop because he opposed the cause of Italian reunification.

Ballerini was unable to take possession of his see as archbishop but Auxiliary bishop Carlo Caccia Dominioni governed the archdiocese. In October 1866 bishop Caccia di Dominioni died and the chapter of the Milan cathedral named Filippo Carcano as vicar of the archbishop, Ballerini didn't agree with this decision so in order to avoid other problems pope Pius IX named Luigi Nazari di Calabiana as Archbishop of Milan and Ballerini was named as Latin Patriarch of Alexandria. The former archbishop of Milan participated in the First Vatican Council, where he supported the dogma of papal infallibility.

Ballerini spent his later life in Seregno, where he died in 1897.

Cause of beatification
The Archdiocese of Milan opened his cause of canonization in 2015 and he is now known as a Servant of God.

Works 

 Sancti Ambrosii Mediolanensis episcopi..., Opera omnia, curante P.A. Ballerini, I-VI, Mediolani, e Typographia Sancti Josephi, 1875-1883.

References

External links 
Hagiography Circle

1814 births
1897 deaths
Archbishops of Milan
Italian Servants of God
Participants in the First Vatican Council
19th-century Italian Roman Catholic archbishops